Vanished is an American serial drama television series produced by 20th Century Fox. The series premiered on August 21, 2006 on Fox and its last episode aired on November 10, 2006. Based in Atlanta, Georgia, the series begins with the sudden disappearance of the wife of a Georgia senator, which is quickly revealed to be part of a wider conspiracy. The family of the missing woman, a pair of FBI agents, a journalist and her lover/cameraman, are all drawn into an evolving mystery with political and religious undertones. The show was created by CSI writer Josh Berman, and executive produced by Mimi Leder, who also directed the show, and Paul Redford.

On October 26, 2006, USA Today reported that the planned 22-episode series was ordered to be wrapped up after the 13th episode. The story arc of finding Sara Collins was to be concluded, with the mystery of a larger conspiracy left dangling in the event the series was extended. On November 16, 2006, Fox confirmed that the show would end after a final episode in December.

On December 8, 2006, the final episode of Vanished appeared online. The production team was told a few months before the show was taken off the air to at least reveal Sara's fate by the 13th episode, but none of the other plotlines were resolved.

According to a report of E! Online's Kristin dos Santos on July 23, 2007, the unsolved mystery behind Vanished was to be the focus of an episode of Bones, during the third season. However, the 2007–2008 Writers Guild of America strike shortened the season, and that episode was never developed.

Plot 
A secretive sect of Freemasons is trying to decipher several Dead Sea scrolls found in Jerusalem, Israel, and is willing to go to great length in order to do so. The key storyline revolves around an upcoming supreme court nomination of a new judge. In order to secure to the nomination, the conspirators kidnap the wife of a U.S. Senator, which is the trigger to the entire plot. The supreme court will soon rule on legal evidence issue, which will impact the faith of a renowned Dead Sea scholar currently awaiting execution for killing his research team as well as for his wife murder, although her body was never found. The conspirators are looking to overturn the scholar's conviction therefore freeing him and allowing the decipher of the scrolls. 

The story begins in Atlanta when Sara Collins (nee Jerome) vanishes from a dinner held in her honor. Sara is a teacher, in early 30's, and Senator Jeffrey Collins's second wife. She had previously told her husband that she had a secret to tell him, but disappeared before she could reveal it to him.

The investigation into her kidnapping starts to uncover secrets. While Senator Collins is clean and desperately wants his wife returned, even paying the ransoms will not get her back. He paid $5,000,000 in cash and then voted as requested by kidnappers to confirm a Supreme Court nominee. He initially held support for this nominee, despite being his long time close friend, because he knew the nominee seduced an underage girl.

What Senator Collins did not know was that the underage girl was actually his daughter, Marcy. Marcy ended the affair with the judge after being caught by Sara, but was later raped by him and subsequently became pregnant. Marcy believes she was then poisoned to induce a miscarriage. 

Senator Collins' son, Max, had gotten into trouble over underage drinking and DUI. Sara urged Jeffrey to put him in a rehab facility. There, Max expressed a hatred for his stepmother, which was used against her by the conspiracy (his counselor Quinn was one of the conspirators). 

Senator Collins' ex-wife worked her way back into Senator Collins's life via their mutual children. She confronted Sara over the birth of her child but despite her hatred of Sara, never revealed the truth, given her disappearance. Senator Collins' ex-wife was financially broke and eventually took a bribe from Senator Collins' chief of staff, which she gave to Marcy to help her daughter bail her boyfriend out of jail. 

Sara went through torture and manipulation when she was in captivity. She was fed certain information and that made her believe that Collins took her kidnapping as opportunity to advance his career. These lies led her to flee to the last place where she felt anonymous and safe - the same place she fled the rehab facility once before, Gloucester, Massachusetts.

FBI Agent Graham Kelton solved many aspects of the kidnapping, and even managed to contact the mysterious person leaving St. Nathan prayer cards with clues for him. He found out that the person wanted the conspiracy undone more than Sara's rescue. He eventually solved the real ransom demand of the conspiracy, the supreme court vote, but after stopping the vote with a bioterrorist attack simulation, he was shot and killed by one of the conspirators, before he can give any details.

FBI Agent Lucas takes over after the killing of Agent Graham, and successfully tracks down more leads, leading to a raid on a conspiracy site where dead sea scrolls were being scanned into a computer. However, while he gets very close to Sara a few times after she escapes, he is unable to unravel the false trail Sara left behind her as she escaped to her safe place with Peter Manning. 

Agent Lucas also discovers that a rehab facility, known as Encompass, was used as a front by the conspiracy to recruit addicted vulnerable youth. Sara, Ben, Max and Quinn all attended this same rehab facility, with Quinn later becoming a counselor and a recruiter there. Sara had been checked into this facility by her parents 12  years ago  when she was a 19, however, she escaped. Quinn later shared that Sara was the only person to ever escape the facility, and it might have been a factor in her kidnapping. After Sara's escape she lived for few months under a false name in Gloucester, Massachusetts. There she worked as a waitress in a bar, got into a relationship with Peter Manning local fisherman, and later got pregnant by him. Sara then left without telling anyone, including her boyfriend, gave birth to the a baby girl, name Becca. However, her parents raised Becca as her sister for a reason not fully explained in the show. The FBI wonders why would Sara who was tortured at the Encompass facility conceived Senator Collins to send Max there, but this question is never addressed. 

Ben Wilson, Marcy Collins' boyfriend, was released on bond from Marcy, who believed his story. He believes he is the father of Marcy's unborn child, and despite his innocence over prior events, was enraged by the rape of Marcy and murdered the Judge who attack her. In the end of the show it was unclear If he got away with it. It is also never confirmed if the Marcy's unborn child was a result of her affair with the judge or her relationship with Ben, as both took place at the same time.   

Agent Lucas uncover the mystery around the scholar. After the scholar found the Dead Sea Scrolls he found hidden messages there he thought was so dangerous he destroyed his research, and killed of his research team. He also lied about murdering his wife in order to protect her. However, it was later revealed the conspirators found out his wife was actually alive and kidnapped her leverage to coerce his help with the decipher once he is released from prison. 

Peter Manning is a man searching for the love of his life, who one day vanished from Massachusetts, where he worked on a fishing boat. He sees her again in the news as recently kidnapped wife of Senator Collins news. He still loves her, but his lead to the FBI is classified as low priority. He embarks on a mission to find her. He finds his child, but can't find a way to make things right. He gives up in the end, and returns to his boat to find that Sara is there. It's the place she ran to before; where she could be anonymous and find love. Judy Nash is a reporter covering Sara's kidnapping. She believes in her story about Peter Manning fathering a child with Sara, but is cut off as she doesn't have the proof. While Peter got her proof that he was the father, there is no proof about the mother. Without Sara, there is no story.

The series finale shows Senator Collins in a family dinner with his ex-wife and their two children. Sara, meanwhile, appears in aboard Peter Manning's boat. She says  to explains that twelve years ago she was pregnant and was taken away by "them". Peter interrupts her, and says, "none of that matters now. You're home", and they embrace.

Production history 
Vanished was the first project to emerge from a four-year creative deal between Josh Berman and 20th Century Fox. In January 2006, the studio ordered the production of the pilot and two additional scripts. It was announced that Gale Harold would star.

In April 2006, Vanished became one of two shows to get the early pickup by Fox. The network picked the show up for 12 additional episodes. It was then announced that the show would premiere following Prison Break, in the time slot 24 occupies from January to May.

Shortly thereafter, it was announced that John Allen Nelson would star opposite Harold. On June 19, 2006, it was learned that Penelope Ann Miller would guest star in six episodes and have the option of becoming a regular. It was then announced that Josh Hopkins would guest on several episodes and that Eddie Cibrian would also join the cast.

Gale Harold departed the series after the eighth episode after his character was killed off by the show's producers. Eddie Cibrian was named the lead actor of the series beginning with the ninth episode.

On November 15, 2006 Fox announced they were pulling the show for the rest of sweeps but that it would return on December 1, 2006. On November 16, 2006, Fox said that the show would not return to television and the remaining four episodes would be available online only, with one new show added every Friday and the series finale added December 8, 2006. Originally, the online episodes were only watchable by Windows users visiting Fox's website. Fox has since put the entire series of Vanished online on Hulu.

Episodes 

<small>† These episodes were shown on Vanished'''s MySpace page.</small>

 Cast and characters 

 Main 
 Gale Harold as Graham Kelton
 Eddie Cibrian as Daniel Lucas
 John Allen Nelson as Jeffrey Collins
 Joanne Kelly as Sara Collins
 Rebecca Gayheart as Judy Nash
 Margarita Levieva as Marcy Collins
 John Patrick Amedori as Max Collins
 Chris Egan as Ben Wilson
 Robert Hoffman as Adam Putnam
 Ming-Na Wen as Lin Mei

 Recurring 
 Bianca Kajlich as Quinn Keeler
 Gary Werntz as Edward Morell
 Esai Morales as Michael Tyner
 Christopher Neame as Claude Alexander
 Christopher Cousins as Wallace Rainer
 Brian Elliott as DC Field Agent
 Josh Hopkins as Peter Manning
 David Berman as Edward Dockery
 Leslie Odom Jr. as Malik Christo
 Joseph C. Phillips as J.T. Morse
 Michael Harney as Robert Rubia
 Brandon Quinn as Mark Valera
 Randy Oglesby as Mr. Jerome
 Robin Pearson Rose as Mrs. Jerome
 Penelope Ann Miller as Jessica Nevins
 Michael O'Keefe as Bob Nagel
 Juliette Goglia as Becca Jerome
 Arie Verveen as Aaron Hensliegh
 Tom Schmid as Crane

 Ratings history and reaction 
Despite earning mixed reviews, Vanished had a strong series premiere. Many Prison Break fans kept the channel on Fox to see the new thriller. When the second episode premiered, overall audience share declined compared to the first week. Yet, the show actually increased its share of the coveted 18-to-49-year-old demographic.

The premiere managed to beat TV's two highest rated sitcoms, Two and a Half Men and The New Adventures of Old Christine, in total viewers.

In later weeks the ratings started to show a continued decline due to the strong performance of NBC's new series, Heroes, and returning shows featured in CBS's Monday-night comedy lineup. Although Fox continued to air the series in the U.S., the Global Television network in Canada cancelled the series after airing only five episodes.

Following a three-week hiatus due to the Major League Baseball playoffs, Fox moved Vanished to the Friday Night Death Slot, where only two further episodes were broadcast. The first of these nominally starred Gale Harold, who had been dramatically killed off on episode 7, following weeks of rumors and a storm of viewer protest on various websites. Though Harold appeared as a corpse for a few seconds, this was actually the first episode to feature the show's new leading man Eddie Cibrian. The ratings had plummeted, slicing viewership in half and dropping Vanished to last place in its time slot. The following week the show did even worse, earning only 0.9% of the most desirable 18-to-49-year-old demographic.

On November 15, 2006 Fox announced it was pulling the show for the rest of the November sweeps. The next day, Fox had not yet officially cancelled the series, but announced that the final four unaired episodes would be made available in the U.S. only on the show's official MySpace, according to Fox's website.

In Australia, the first two episodes aired back to back and rated 1.1 million mainland capital city viewers, making it the winner of its time-slot and the eighth most watched program for the night. The third episode's ratings dropped slightly to 998,000 viewers, but retained eighth position for the night. By the fourth episode, ratings dropped again to 809,000 viewers and dropped to fifteenth position for the night. The final episode of Vanished, which screened on March 5, 2007, got 278,000 viewers.

In the United Kingdom, all the Vanished'' episodes aired on Channel Five in a late-night Sunday slot, averaging roughly 500,000 viewers per episode.

References

External links 
 

Serial drama television series
American thriller television series
Fox Broadcasting Company original programming
Television series by 20th Century Fox Television
2000s American crime drama television series
Television shows set in Atlanta
Fictional cults
2006 American television series debuts
2006 American television series endings
English-language television shows